John Wilson Farrelly (July 7, 1809 – December 20, 1860) was an American politician from Pennsylvania who served as a Whig member of the U.S. House of Representatives for Pennsylvania's 22nd congressional district from 1847 to 1849.

Biography
John Wilson Farrelly (son of Patrick Farrelly) was born in Meadville, Pennsylvania.  He received a limited schooling and graduated from Allegheny College at Meadville in 1826.  He studied law, was admitted to the bar in 1828 and commenced practice in Meadville.  He served as a member of the Pennsylvania House of Representatives in 1837.  He served as a member of the Pennsylvania State Senate for the 21st district from 1841 to 1842 and for the 26th district from 1843 to 1844.

Farrelly was elected as a Whig to the Thirtieth Congress.  He served as chairman of the United States House Committee on Patents during the Thirtieth Congress.  He was not a candidate for renomination in 1848.  He was appointed Sixth Auditor of the Treasury by President Zachary Taylor and served from November 5, 1849, until April 9, 1853, when he resigned.  He engaged in the practice of law in Meadville until his death in 1860.  He was interred in Greendale Cemetery in Meadville, Pennsylvania.

Footnotes

Sources

The Political Graveyard

|-

|-

1809 births
1860 deaths
19th-century American politicians
Allegheny College alumni
Burials in Pennsylvania
Members of the Pennsylvania House of Representatives
Pennsylvania lawyers
Pennsylvania state senators
People from Meadville, Pennsylvania
Whig Party members of the United States House of Representatives from Pennsylvania
Burials at Greendale Cemetery
19th-century American lawyers